First Reformed Church, also known as Piermont Reformed Church and First Protestant Dutch Church of Piermont, is a historic Reformed Church in America church located at Piermont, Rockland County, New York. It was built in 1946, and is a one-story, three-bay by four-bay, Wren-Gibbs Colonial Revival style church. It features a central square tower topped by a hexagonal steeple.  Attached to the church is a side-gabled, I-shaped parish hall, completed in 1952. Also on the property is the contributing parsonage (c. 1860).  Organized in 1839, it is home to oldest congregation in Piermont.

It was listed on the National Register of Historic Places in 2015.

References

External links
Piermont Reformed Church website

Reformed Church in America churches in New York (state)
Churches on the National Register of Historic Places in New York (state)
Colonial Revival architecture in New York (state)
Churches completed in 1946
Churches in Rockland County, New York
National Register of Historic Places in Rockland County, New York